Savage Messiah may refer to:

 Savage Messiah (1972 film), a 1972 British biographical film
 Savage Messiah (2002 film), a 2002 Canadian drama film
 Savage Messiah (band), an English thrash/heavy metal band
 Savage Messiah (novel), a 2005 novel by Robert Newcomb
 Savage Messiah, a zine and blog by the British artist Laura Oldfield Ford